An elite pact, settlement or political settlement is an agreement or understanding between political elites which moderates the violence and winner takes all nature of unrestrained conflict.  Such settlements are often understood to transform government from an autocratic mode into more pluralistic, democratic form.  However, others view the political settlement as normatively neutral.

This concept in political theory is part of elite theory and state-building.  Joel Migdal has suggested that the concept of political settlements has a pedigree going back to the work of Barrington Moore.  Political settlements are the frameworks for governing a state established by elites, either through formal processes or informally over time.  There are numerous definitions of political settlements and elite pacts, often including an emphasis on understandings between elites that bring about the conditions to end conflict, or maintain peace.  In 2011 the World Bank's World Development Report suggested a new terminology for political settlements with the concept of `good enough coalitions.'

Elite pacts can be explicitly articulated (enshrined in an evolving
document – such as a peace agreement or a constitution).

Verena Fritz and Alina Rocha Menocal published a paper in 2007 arguing that political settlements are a `domain' at the heart of all state processes.  They relate the concept to broader state theory (including the issues of elections and legitimacy).  They stress that political settlements are not one-off events but evolve over time.

Important contributions on the establishing of political settlements in modern (particularly newly democratic) states have also been made by Thomas Carothers and Marina Ottaway of the Carnegie Endowment for International Peace.  Also of note is JC Scott's work `Seeing Like a State' which explores the routes through which political settlements in medieval Europe began to consolidate formal state structures.

More recently Christine Bell of the Political Settlements Research Programme has argued that political settlements analysis is centrally concerned with how to understand and support elite pacts while enabling transformation to other forms of broader inclusion.

In political science the concept of `political settlements' is distinct from short-term processes aimed at elite agreements, such as a `peace process' or `peace agreement.'  Peace negotiations and agreements may be part of the process of achieving a political settlement, but the settlement itself is the period of time for which an elite agreement holds, which could last for days or centuries.

Controversially the political scientist Patrick Chabal has suggested that the concept of political settlements is often less useful than that of `political sedimentation,' the residue of elite accommodation that is left after a period of contestation or explicit conflict, (quoted from Whaites above) see also.

The term political settlement is now use by key development agencies, despite confusion over what exactly the term means, and doubts over how the concept assists development actors intervene more effectively to support stable, open and inclusive political settlement.

References 

 Bell, Christine, What we talk about when we talk about Political Settlements, PSRP Working paper 1, 1 September 2015
 Fritz, V and Rocha Menocal A, Understanding state-building from a political economy perspective, ODI, London 2007
Migdal Joel, State in Society, CUP, 2001
Moore, B, `Social Origins of Dictatorship and Democracy,' Beacon Press 1993
Scott, JC, `Seeing Like a State,' Yale University Press, 1999
Whaites, A, States in Development, DFID, London 2008

Political theories